Victor Nunes Leal (11 November 1914 – 17 May 1985) was a Brazilian jurist, Minister of the Supreme Federal Court and professor at the Federal University of Rio de Janeiro (UFRJ).

He graduated from the National Faculty of Law of the Federal University of Rio de Janeiro, then known as the University of Brazil, in 1936.

He helped draft the Brazilian Code of Civil Procedure (Portuguese:Código de Processo Civil) of 1939.

Early life

Leal was born on 11 November 1914 in the Brazilian municipality of Carangola, Minas Gerais, to Nascimento Nunes Leal and Angelina de Oliveira Leal.

He completed his secondary education in Carangola and Juiz de Fora, after which he moved to Rio de Janeiro to attend the National Faculty of Law.

References

|-

1914 births
1985 deaths
20th-century Brazilian judges
Federal University of Rio de Janeiro alumni
Academic staff of the Federal University of Rio de Janeiro
People from Minas Gerais
Supreme Federal Court of Brazil justices